Vincenzo Camuccini (22 February 1771 – 2 September 1844) was an Italian painter of Neoclassic histories and religious paintings. He was considered the premier academic painter of his time in Rome.

Biography
Camuccini was born in Rome, and first educated by his brother Pietro, a picture-restorer, and Pietro Leone Bombelli, an engraver.  His brother Pietro gave up his place in the studio of Domenico Corvi to Vincenzo. Until nearly the age of 30 he mainly dedicated himself to copying old masters.

As an original painter, Camuccini belongs to the Neoclassicist school fostered in Rome by Anton Raphael Mengs.  Camuccini's first major independent work, completed around 1798, was a large canvas of The Death of Julius Caesar. This led to the assessment that Camuccini may have been influenced by Jacques-Louis David's classic Roman themes and style; but it is more likely both were emerging from the rising Neoclassic refocus towards images of and derived from Greco-Roman themes.

In 1800, he was commissioned an Incredulity of St. Thomas (copy of mosaic) by the Vatican. In 1806, Gaspare Landi received a commission for two large canvases for the chapel of the Madonna of the Rosary in the church of San Giovanni in Piacenza. Ultimately, the commission was split with Camuccini who painted a Presentation in the Temple. The canvases  by the two artists were completed in the early spring of 1806, and were exhibited side by side at the Pantheon at Easter of that year.

Of pictures on classic Greco-Roman history were: 
Horatius Cocles.
Romulus and Remus.
Departure of Regulus for Carthage.
Death of Virginia.
Continence of Scipio.
Death of Caesar.

He also painted: 
Incredulity of St. Thomas reproduced in mosaic in St. Peter's at Rome.
Presentation in the Temple for San Giovanni at Piacenza.
Death of the Magdalen.
The Entombment painted for Charles IV of Spain.
Apparition of Christ in Limbo (1829)
Conversion of St. Paul (1834) for the basilica of San Paolo fuori le Mura in Rome.
Romolo and Remo's discovery

He also painted a Betrothal of Psyche, and, jointly with Landi, he painted, in fresco, the ceiling of the Torlonia Palace.

As a portrait painter he attained considerable eminence; among the best he produced are those of Pope Pius VII (now in the Gallery at Vienna); the Comte de Blacas, Ambassador from France to the Holy See; the King of Naples; and the Queen of Naples; The Countess Sehouvaloff; and the Countess von Dietrichstein (1829). Several of his works were engraved by Pietro Bettelini, and some have been lithographed by Giovanni Scudellari, and published under the title of I Fasti principali della Vita di Gesú Cristo, with text in Italian and French at Rome, in 1829. Camuccini was appointed inspector-general of the Museums of the Pope, and of the Factory of Mosaics, and director of the Neapolitan Academy of Rome. He was a member of the Institute of France, during some years president of the Academy of St. Luke. Pope Pius VII conferred upon him the title of Baron, with hereditary succession, and the Emperor Francis I the order of the Iron Crown. In 1829, he was elected into the National Academy of Design as an Honorary member. He died at Rome in 1844.

He expended no small portion of his wealth in the purchase of a fine collection of objects of art. In 1856, the greater portion of the pictures, upwards of seventy in number, were purchased being bought by the duke of Northumberland, who removed them to Alnwick Castle. They consist principally of the works of the Italian masters living in the 16th and 17th centuries, with some specimens of an earlier date, and a few others of the Dutch and Flemish painters of the 17th century. He purchased a Raphael, known as Madonna of the Pinks.

On September 9, 1833, excavations at the Pantheon brought to light the tomb of Raphael, and Camuccini was commissioned to draw the archaeological discovery, which he did with religious precision, as if a new holy martyr, but this time for art, had been discovered.

Among his many pupils and followers were Nicola de Laurentiis of Chieti.

Notes

References

 Ulrich W. Hiesinger, "The Paintings of Vincenzo Camuccini, 1771–1844," The Art Bulletin, vol. 60, 1978, pp. 297–320. (definitive modern study with much more recent information than in current account – 2/23/15)

Attribution:

External links

1771 births
1844 deaths
Painters from Rome
18th-century Italian painters
Italian male painters
19th-century Italian painters
Italian neoclassical painters
Brera Academy alumni
19th-century Italian male artists
18th-century Italian male artists